Thong Pha Phum is a district (amphoe) in the northern part of Kanchanaburi province, central Thailand.

History
At first Thong Pha Phum was the minor district (king amphoe) Sangkhla Buri, a subordinate of Wang Ka District. In 1939 the name Sangkhla Buri was assigned to Wang Ka, while the minor district was renamed Thong Pha Phum. On 20 May 1941 it was upgraded to a full district, while at the same time Sangkhla Buri was reduced to a minor district. It then consisted of the six tambons Tha Khanun, Hin Dat, Dika, Chalae, Pilok, and Linthin.

The economy includes the 460 million baht cleanup of the lead tailings in Klity Creek, caused by a now-closed lead processing factory; the cleanup is "the first state-supervised environmental cleanup in Thailand". The Bo Ngam lead mine severely contaminated the soil, where the lead content was as high at 15%. Despite this, 48 species of plants were found growing in the area, suggesting possible bioremediation.

Geography
Neighboring are (from west clockwise) Tanintharyi Division of Myanmar, Sangkhla Buri, Umphang of Tak province, Ban Rai of Uthai Thani province, Si Sawat and Sai Yok of Kanchanaburi Province.

The district's important water resource is the Khwae Noi River, which is dammed by the district's Vajiralongkorn Dam.

Thong Pha Phum, Lam Khlong Ngu, Khuean Srinagarindra, and Khao Laem National Parks are found in the district.

Administration
The district is divided into seven sub-districts (tambons), which are further subdivided into 44 villages (mubans). Thong Pha Phum itself is a township (thesaban tambon) and covers parts of the tambon Tha Khanun. There are a further seven tambon administrative organizations (TAO).

Climate

References

External links

amphoe.com
 Khao Laem National Park

Thong Pha Phum